Enrique Raúl Báez  (born 16 January 1966) is a former Uruguayan footballer who played as a forward.

International career
Báez made 14 appearances for the senior Uruguay national football team from 1986 to 1988. He also played in the 1987 Copa América.

References

1966 births
Living people
People from Santa Lucía, Uruguay
Uruguayan footballers
Uruguay international footballers
Uruguayan expatriate footballers
1987 Copa América players
Montevideo Wanderers F.C. players
Club Nacional de Football players
FK Austria Wien players
Talleres de Remedios de Escalada footballers
Uruguayan Primera División players
Austrian Football Bundesliga players
Expatriate footballers in Argentina
Expatriate footballers in Austria
Copa América-winning players

Association football forwards